Gerhard Thäter (18 November 1916, in Kiel – 15 February 2004, in Wilhelmshaven) was a German naval officer.

When the Federal Republic of Germany established her own armed forces in 1956, Thäter joined the Bundesmarine. In the course of his service he was made Naval Attaché to West Germany's embassy at Ottawa, Canada.

On 15 February 2004 Thäter died in Wilhelmshaven, Germany.

References

Bibliography

External links

UBootwaffe.net webpage about U-466
Captain Gerhard Thäter

Awards
Gerhard Thäter's awards include the German Cross in Gold for repeated acts of bravery, the Iron Cross Second Class, and the U-Boat War Badge.

U-boat commanders (Kriegsmarine)
1916 births
2004 deaths
German Navy personnel
Military personnel from Kiel
People from the Province of Schleswig-Holstein
German diplomats
German expatriates in Canada